Malaysia national under-23 football team 2008–present results.

Results

Keynotes

 * Malaysia's score always listed first
 (H) Home country stadium
 (A) Away country stadium
 (N) Neutral venue stadium
 1 Non FIFA 'A' international match

2010–present results

2019

2018

2017

2015

2014

2013

2012

2011

2010

2000–2009 results

2009

2008

References

 
National under-23 association football team results